The Water Industry Commission for Scotland (WICS) is the economic regulator of the water and sewerage industry in Scotland. Established in 2005, it is an executive non-departmental public body of the Scottish Government with statutory responsibilities.

The Commission's board comprises a non-executive chairman and three two non-executive members. It is based in Stirling and is led by the Chief Executive, Alan Sutherland.

Activities

Price setting
The Water Industry Commission for Scotland has a statutory duty to promote the interests of customers by setting prices for water and sewerage services that deliver Scottish Ministers’ objectives for the water industry at the lowest reasonable overall cost. The objectives include improvements in water quality, environmental performance and customer service. The price setting process takes place every six years, with the current regulatory period covering the years 2015-2021.

Monitoring performance
The Commission monitors and reports on Scottish Water’s performance regarding customer service, investment, costs and leakage. The Commission sets challenging targets for Scottish Water to achieve and monitors performance to make sure that it responds positively to these challenges.
The regulatory framework in Scotland has resulted in Scottish Water becoming significantly more efficient and has helped keep bills low – average household bills in 2015-16 are around £40 lower than they are in England and Wales.

Competition
The Commission is also responsible for facilitating competition in the Scottish water industry. In April 2008 Scotland became the first country in the world to open up water and sewerage services to competition for all non-household customers, under the Water Services etc. (Scotland) Act 2005. This means that all non-household customers (public sector, non-profit and business organisations) are able to choose who provides their services. The Commission is responsible for implementing the framework set out in the Act, including licensing all participants in the market. Since competition has been introduced there have been significant improvements for customers, with more options and better services.

See also
 Water supply and sanitation in Scotland

References

External links
 
 Scotland on Tap

Executive non-departmental public bodies of the Scottish Government
Water supply and sanitation in Scotland
Consumer rights agencies
Organisations based in Stirling (council area)
Regulators of Scotland
Water management authorities
2005 establishments in Scotland
Organizations established in 2005
Consumer organisations in the United Kingdom